St. Paul's Preparatory Academy is a private Christian school located in Arlington, Texas for early childhood through grade 12.

References

Christian schools in Texas
Private high schools in Texas